The mont du Midi (in English: Midi Mount) is a mountain in the Les Etchemins Regional County Municipality, near Saint-Luc-de-Bellechasse, in region of Chaudière-Appalaches, in Quebec, in Canada.

It is part of the Massif-du-Sud Regional Park.

Geography 
This mountain peak is located about twenty kilometers north of the municipality of Lac-Etchemin and 2 km west of the Claude-Mélançon Ecological Reserve. This summit is the highest peak between Mont Mégantic and the Chic-Choc Mountains. This mountain peak is located about twenty kilometers north of the municipality of Lac-Etchemin and 2 km west of the Claude-Mélançon Ecological Reserve. It is part of the Parc régional du Massif-du-Sud

See also 
List of mountains of Quebec

References 

Appalachian summits
Summits of Chaudière-Appalaches
Notre Dame Mountains
Les Etchemins Regional County Municipality
Mountains of Quebec under 1000 metres